Alma, Where Do You Live? is a 1910 Broadway musical with lyrics and book by George V. Hobart and music by Jean Briquet. It opened at Weber's Music Hall on September 26, 1910, and closed on April 15, 1911, totaling 232 performances. The show was adapted from a German translation of a French play by Paul Nerve.

Joe Weber produced and directed the show, with Hugo Frey acting as musical director.

After the show's initial Broadway run, it toured some cities in 1912, including Lodi, California.

The show was later adapted into a film of the same name.

Plot 
A wealthy Parisian man dies, leaving his entire four million franc fortune to his nephew, Pierre Le Peach, on the condition that he has not had sex with or proposed to any women by a certain date. If this condition is violated, the fortune will be inherited by Theobold and Gaston. The two men decide to enlist Alma, a beautiful milliner, to tempt Pierre into proposing before the given date in the will. Alma, however, falls in love with Pierre, and prevents him from proposing before he properly receives his inheritance. The date passes, Pierre receives the inheritance, and he and Alma marry.

Cast

Songs

Act l 
 Boo Hoo-Hoo (Louise)
 Nevermore (Theobold and Gaston)
 Alma (Alma)
 Girlies (Pierre le Peach)
 Childhood Days (Alma and Pierre le Peach)
 FInale

Act ll 
 Bogie Boo (Theobold and Gaston)
 The Land of Beautiful Dreams (Alma and Pierre le Peach)
 Sail Home (Alma)
 Love Me (The Tom Cat Song) (Pierre le Peach)
 Finale

Act lll 
 Show Me Around and Around (Theobold)
 Kiss Me, My Love (Alma and Pierre le Peach)
 Finale

References

External links 

1910 musicals
Broadway musicals
Plays set in France